Daniel Brodmeier (born 2 September 1987) is a German rifle shooter. He competed at the 2012 Summer Olympics, where he placed 5th in the 50 m rifle prone event and 32nd in the 50 m rifle three positions event. At the 2016 Summer Olympics, he placed 4th in the 50 m rifle three positions event and 37th in the 50 m rifle prone event.

References

External links
 
 
 
 

1987 births
Living people
German male sport shooters
Olympic shooters of Germany
Shooters at the 2012 Summer Olympics
Shooters at the 2016 Summer Olympics
People from Kelheim
Sportspeople from Lower Bavaria
Shooters at the 2015 European Games
European Games competitors for Germany
ISSF rifle shooters
20th-century German people
21st-century German people